Akkol (Aqköl), formerly known as Alexeyevka (until 1997), is a town in northern Kazakhstan. The town is the administrative centre of Akkol District of Akmola Region. Most of the people are Kazakhs and Russians. There are smaller minorities of Ukrainians and Germans. The population is 

From its foundation in 1887 till 1997 it had borne the name Alexeyevka. It sits on the western side of a lake of the same name. Thus, it is located between the lake, thick pine forest running to the Russian Federation and a broad plain spreading towards Nur-Sultan. The population of the neighbourhood centre numbers around 14,000 inhabitants. The Kazakh population is around 40%. The rest is composed mostly of the Slavonic people, such as Russians and Ukrainians. Most of the buildings in the town consist of single-storey private houses, though there are also many five-storey buildings in the town. On the western side Akkol is sheltered by a pine-covered volcano named in Russian Kalancha (Watchtower) and in Kazakh Monshakty (having beads). There is also a ground mission control centre of Kazcosmos inside the pine forest as well as a ski resort named “SharZhum” which accommodates guests and tourists throughout the year on the timber edge. There is also a municipal park in the middle of Akkol. The town is divided into two parts by a railroad intersected by two curved bridges and one railroad crossing with barrier.

References

Populated places in Akmola Region
Populated places established in 1887